Całowanie  is a village in the administrative district of Gmina Karczew, within Otwock County, Masovian Voivodeship, in east-central Poland.

External links
 Jewish Community in Całowanie on Virtual Shtetl

References

Villages in Otwock County